Islām Pinjah, sometimes transliterated as Eslām Panjāh, is a village in Balkh Province, in northern Afghanistan.

See also 
Balkh Province

References

Populated places in Balkh Province